Naveen or Navin (Sanskrit: नवीन, Tamil: நவீன், ; meaning "new", "fresh", "young", "bright", "creative") is an Indian  given name and surname.
[ syll. na-vee(n), nav-e-en ] The baby boy name Naveen is pronounced as NEYVIY-N †. Naveen is used chiefly in the English and Indian languages, and its origin is Sanskrit and Tamil. It is derived from the element 'navina' meaning new. The name Navina (English and Indian) is the female form of Naveen.

Navean, Naveane, Naveene, Navin (English and Indian), Navine, Navyn, and Navyne are variants of Naveen. 

Notable people with that name include:
Naveen John, NJ creations photographer
Naveen Eugene, IBM
Ampasayya Naveen, Indian novelist
Naveen Andrews, British actor
Naveen Asrani, Indian cricketer
Navin Chawla, Indian bureaucrat
Naveen Jain, American chief executive
Naveen Jindal, Indian politician
Naveen Kumar (disambiguation), several people
Naveen Naqvi, Pakistani journalist
Naveen Patnaik, Indian politician
Naveen Perwani, Pakistani snooker player
Naveen Polishetty, Indian actor
Naveen Soni, Indian journalist
Vadde Naveen, Indian actor
Naveen Waqar, Pakistani VJ and model.
Yalavarthi Naveen Babu (1964–2000), or simply Naveen, a Naxalite leader in India
Naveen-ul-Haq, Afghan cricketer

Fictional characters
Prince Naveen, a character in the 2009 Disney animated film The Princess and the Frog

See also
 Naveen Shahdara, residential area in North East Delhi

References

Indian masculine given names